Gudachari 117 is a 1989 Indian Telugu-language spy film directed by Kodi Ramakrishna. It stars Krishna, Bhanupriya, Mahesh Babu with music composed by Chakravarthy. The film was produced by C. H. Gandhi and D. Murali under the Sree Vijay Kalyan Movies banner. It was a commercial success, and had a 100-day theatrical run at the box office.

Plot
The film begins, 4 scientists come up with a nugget of creating a powerful satellite, who are kidnapped by a terrorist organization. The rest of the story revolves around the protection of scientists and restoring the satellite by Chandrakanth (Krishna), Secret Agent 117.

Cast
Krishna as Chandrakanth, Secret Agent 117
Bhanupriya as Jhansi & Rekha (dual role)
Mahesh Babu as Chinna
Murali Mohan as D.I.G. Bhargav 
Gollapudi Maruthi Rao as Gajakarnam
Giri Babu as Gookarnam
Ahuti Prasad as Vinod 
Chalasani Krishna Rao as Supremo
C. S. Rao as Pilot
Chakrapani as Co-Pilot
Bhimeswara Rao as Scientist Sarma
Baby Raasi as Baby

Soundtrack

Music composed by Chakravarthy. Lyrics were written by Veturi. The music released on AMC Audio Company.

References

1980s Telugu-language films
Indian spy action films
Films directed by Kodi Ramakrishna
Films scored by K. Chakravarthy